The Akova Castle is a medieval fortification in Gortynia, Arcadia, Greece. The medieval castle, also known as Mattegriffon, is built on top of a steep hill, inaccessible from the three sides.

The castle was the centre of the Barony of Akova, one of the most important lordships of the Frankish Principality of Achaea, established in the Morea after the Fourth Crusade. Below the castle are ruins of an unidentified ancient acropolis, possibly ancient Teuthis. 

For the last 40 years, Akova has been the site of a summer festival, involving theatrical plays and other cultural activities, hosted by the nearby village of Vyziki.

Sources
 
 

Castles and fortifications of the Principality of Achaea
Buildings and structures in Arcadia, Peloponnese
13th-century fortifications in Greece